Andrew Hargreaves may refer to:

 Andrew Hargreaves (politician) (born 1955), British Conservative Party
 Andy Hargreaves (academic) (born 1951), Boston College